Lloyd N. Mumphord (born December 20, 1946) is a former defensive back who played collegiately for Texas Southern University and ten seasons in American Pro Football. He played professionally for the Miami Dolphins of the American Football League and the Dolphins and Baltimore Colts of the National Football League. He played in three Super Bowls for the Dolphins, and served as their captain of the Special Teams.
He currently holds NFL records for punt and kick blocks in a season and a career.

Mumphord graduated from Middleton High School in Tampa, Florida in 1965.

See also 
Other American Football League Players

References

1946 births
Living people
Players of American football from Los Angeles
American football cornerbacks
Texas Southern Tigers football players
Miami Dolphins players
Baltimore Colts players
American Football League players
Players of American football from Tampa, Florida